Isberg is a Swedish surname that may refer to

David Isberg (born 1975), Swedish musician
Jan-Gunnar Isberg (born 1947), Swedish brigadier general
Kerstin Isberg (1913–1984), Swedish swimmer
Paul Isberg (1882–1955), Swedish sailor
Ralph Isberg (born 1955), American professor
Samson Isberg (1795–1873), Norwegian executioner
Sixten Isberg (1921–2012), Swedish alpine skier
Sophia Isberg (1819–1875), Swedish wood-cut artist
Torunn Isberg (born 1949), Norwegian artistic gymnast
Ture Isberg, Swedish footballer

Swedish-language surnames